Danny Halligan (born 17 February 1965) is a former association football player who represented New Zealand at an international level.

Halligan spent 2 years with Brisbane United in the Australian National Soccer League from 1991 to 1993

He made his full All Whites debut in a 1–1 draw against Australia on 2 September 1987 and ended his international playing career with 36 A-international caps and 5 goals to his credit, his final cap came in a 0–3 loss to Australia on 6 June 1993.

References

External links

1965 births
Living people
New Zealand association footballers
New Zealand international footballers
National Soccer League (Australia) players
Association football midfielders
Brisbane Strikers FC players